

Events

Pre-1600
27 BC – Octavian transfers the state to the free disposal of the Roman Senate and the people. He receives Spain, Gaul, and Syria as his province for ten years. 
 532 – The Nika riots break out, during the racing season at the Hippodrome in Constantinople, as a result of discontent with the rule of the Emperor Justinian I.
1435 – Sicut Dudum, forbidding the enslavement of the Guanche natives in Canary Islands by the Spanish, is promulgated by Pope Eugene IV.
1547 – Henry Howard, Earl of Surrey, is sentenced to death for treason, on the grounds of having quartered his arms to make them similar to those of the King, Henry VIII of England.

1601–1900
1793 – Nicolas Jean Hugon de Bassville, representative of Revolutionary France, is lynched by a mob in Rome.
1797 – French Revolutionary Wars: A naval battle between a French ship of the line and two British frigates off the coast of Brittany ends with the French vessel running aground, resulting in over 900 deaths.
1815 – War of 1812: British troops capture Fort Peter in St. Marys, Georgia, the only battle of the war to take place in the state.
1822 – The design of the Greek flag is adopted by the First National Assembly at Epidaurus.
1833 – United States President Andrew Jackson writes to Vice President elect Martin Van Buren expressing his opposition to South Carolina's defiance of federal authority in the Nullification Crisis.
1840 – The steamship Lexington burns and sinks four miles off the coast of Long Island with the loss of 139 lives.
1842 – Dr. William Brydon, an assistant surgeon in the British East India Company Army during the First Anglo-Afghan War, becomes famous for being the sole survivor of an army of 4,500 men and 12,000 camp followers when he reaches the safety of a garrison in Jalalabad, Afghanistan.
1847 – The Treaty of Cahuenga ends the Mexican–American War in California.
1849 – Establishment of the Colony of Vancouver Island.
  1849   – Second Anglo-Sikh War: Battle of Chillianwala: British forces retreat from the Sikhs.
1888 – The National Geographic Society is founded in Washington, D.C.
1893 – The Independent Labour Party of the United Kingdom holds its first meeting.
1895 – First Italo-Ethiopian War: The war's opening battle, the Battle of Coatit, occurs; it is an Italian victory.
1898 – Émile Zola's J'accuse…! exposes the Dreyfus affair.
1900 – To combat Czech nationalism, Emperor Franz Joseph decrees German will be language of the Austro-Hungarian Armed Forces.

1901–present
1908 – The Rhoads Opera House fire in Boyertown, Pennsylvania kills 171 people.
1915 – The 6.7  Avezzano earthquake shakes the Province of L'Aquila in Italy with a maximum Mercalli intensity of XI (Extreme), killing between 29,978 and 32,610.
1920 – The Reichstag Bloodbath of January 13, 1920, the bloodiest demonstration in German history. 
1935 – A plebiscite in Saarland shows that 90.3% of those voting wish to join Nazi Germany.
1939 – The Black Friday bushfires burn  of land in Australia, claiming the lives of 71 people.
1942 – Henry Ford patents a soybean car, which is 30% lighter than a regular car.
  1942   – World War II: First use of an aircraft ejection seat by a German test pilot in a Heinkel He 280 jet fighter.
1950 – British submarine  collides with an oil tanker in the Thames Estuary, killing 64 men.
  1950   – Finland forms diplomatic relations with the People's Republic of China.
1951 – First Indochina War: The Battle of Vĩnh Yên begins.
1953 – An article appears in Pravda accusing some of the most prestigious and prominent doctors, mostly Jews, in the Soviet Union of taking part in a vast plot to poison members of the top Soviet political and military leadership.
1958 – The Moroccan Army of Liberation ambushes a Spanish patrol in the Battle of Edchera.
1963 – Coup d'état in Togo results in the assassination of president Sylvanus Olympio.
1964 – Anti-Muslim riots break out in Calcutta, in response to anti-Hindu riots in East Pakistan. About one hundred people are killed.
  1964   – In Manchester, New Hampshire, fourteen-year-old Pamela Mason is murdered. Edward Coolidge is tried and convicted of the crime, but the conviction is set aside by the landmark Fourth Amendment case Coolidge v. New Hampshire (1971).
1966 – Robert C. Weaver becomes the first African American Cabinet member when he is appointed United States Secretary of Housing and Urban Development.
1968 – Johnny Cash performs live at Folsom State Prison.
1972 – Prime Minister Kofi Abrefa Busia and President Edward Akufo-Addo of Ghana are ousted in a bloodless military coup by Colonel Ignatius Kutu Acheampong.
1977 – Japan Air Lines Cargo Flight 1045, a Douglas DC-8 jet, crashes onto the runway during takeoff from Ted Stevens Anchorage International Airport, killing five.
1978 – United States Food and Drug Administration requires all blood donations to be labeled "paid" or "volunteer" donors.
1982 – Shortly after takeoff, Air Florida Flight 90, a Boeing 737 jet, crashes into Washington, D.C.'s 14th Street Bridge and falls into the Potomac River, killing 78 including four motorists.
1985 – A passenger train plunges into a ravine in Ethiopia, killing 428 in the worst railroad disaster in Africa.
1986 – A month-long violent struggle begins in Aden, South Yemen between supporters of Ali Nasir Muhammad and Abdul Fattah Ismail, resulting in thousands of casualties.
1988 – Lee Teng-hui becomes the first native Taiwanese President of the Republic of China.
1990 – Douglas Wilder becomes the first elected African American governor as he takes office as Governor of Virginia in Richmond, Virginia.
1991 – Soviet Union troops attack Lithuanian independence supporters in Vilnius, killing 14 people and wounding around 1,000 others. 
1993 – Space Shuttle program: Endeavour heads for space for the third time as STS-54 launches from the Kennedy Space Center.
  1993   – The Chemical Weapons Convention (CWC) is signed.
  1993   – Operation Southern Watch: U.S.A.F., U.S.N., R.A.F. and French Air Force jets attack AAA and SAM sites in Southern Iraq.
1998 – Alfredo Ormando sets himself on fire in St. Peter's Square, protesting against homophobia.
2001 – An earthquake hits El Salvador, killing more than 800.
2012 – The passenger cruise ship Costa Concordia sinks off the coast of Italy due to the captain Francesco Schettino's negligence and irresponsibility. There are 32 confirmed deaths.
2018 – A false emergency alert warning of an impending missile strike in Hawaii causes widespread panic in the state.
2020 – The Thai Ministry of Public Health confirms the first case of COVID-19 outside China. 
2021 – Outgoing U.S. President Donald Trump is impeached for a second time on a charge of incitement of insurrection following the January 6 United States Capitol attack one week prior.

Births

Pre-1600
5 BC – Guangwu of Han, Chinese emperor (d. 57)
101 – Lucius Aelius, Roman adopted son of Hadrian (d. 138)
 915 – Al-Hakam II, Umayyad caliph (d. 976)
1334 – Henry II, king of Castile and León (d. 1379)
1338 – Jeong Mong-ju, Korean civil minister, diplomat and scholar (d. 1392)
1381 – Colette of Corbie, French abbess and saint in the Catholic Church (d. 1447)
1400 – Infante John, Constable of Portugal (d. 1442)
1477 – Henry Percy, 5th Earl of Northumberland (d. 1527)
1505 – Joachim II Hector, Elector of Brandenburg (d. 1571)
1562 – Mark Alexander Boyd, Scottish poet and soldier (d. 1601)
1596 – Jan van Goyen, Dutch painter and illustrator (d. 1656)

1601–1900
1610 – Maria Anna of Bavaria, archduchess of Austria (d. 1665)
1616 – Antoinette Bourignon, French-Flemish mystic and author (d. 1680)
1651 – Henry Booth, 1st Earl of Warrington, English soldier and politician, Chancellor of the Exchequer (d. 1694)
1672 – Lucy Filippini, Italian teacher and saint (d. 1732)
1683 – Christoph Graupner, German harpsichord player and composer (d. 1760)
1720 – Richard Hurd, English bishop (d. 1808)
1749 – Maler Müller, German poet, painter, and playwright (d. 1825)
1787 – John Davis, American lawyer and politician, 14th Governor of Massachusetts (d. 1854)
1804 – Paul Gavarni, French illustrator (d. 1866)
1805 – Thomas Dyer, American lawyer and politician, 18th Mayor of Chicago (d. 1862)
1808 – Salmon P. Chase, American jurist and politician, 6th Chief Justice of the United States (d. 1873)
1810 – Ernestine Rose, American suffragist, abolitionist, and freethinker (d. 1892) 
1812 – Victor de Laprade, French poet and critic (d. 1883)
1832 – Horatio Alger, Jr., American novelist and journalist (d. 1899)
1845 – Félix Tisserand, French astronomer and academic (d. 1896)
1858 – Oskar Minkowski, Lithuanian-German biologist and academic (d. 1931)
1859 – Kostis Palamas, Greek poet and playwright (d. 1943)
1861 – Max Nonne, German neurologist and academic (d. 1959)
1864 – Wilhelm Wien, German physicist and academic, Nobel Prize laureate (d. 1928)
1865 – Princess Marie of Orléans (d. 1908)
1866 – Vasily Kalinnikov, Russian bassoon player and composer (d. 1901)
1869 – Prince Emanuele Filiberto, Duke of Aosta (d. 1931)
1870 – Ross Granville Harrison, American biologist and anatomist (d. 1959)
1878 – Lionel Groulx, Canadian priest and historian (d. 1967)
1881 – Essington Lewis, Australian engineer and businessman (d. 1961)
1883 – Nathaniel Cartmell, American runner and coach (d. 1967)
1885 – Alfred Fuller, Canadian-American businessman, founded the Fuller Brush Company (d. 1973)
1886 – Art Ross, Canadian-American ice hockey player and coach (d. 1964)
  1886   – Sophie Tucker, Russian-born American singer and actress (d. 1966)
1890 – Jüri Uluots, Estonian journalist, lawyer, and politician, 7th Prime Minister of Estonia (d. 1945)
1892 – Ermanno Aebi, Italian-Swiss footballer (d. 1976)
1893 – Charles Arnison, English lieutenant and pilot (d. 1974)
  1893   – Roy Cazaly, Australian footballer and coach (d. 1963)
  1893   – Clark Ashton Smith, American poet, sculptor, painter, and author (d. 1961)
  1893   – Chaïm Soutine, Belarusian-French painter (d. 1943)
1900 – Shimizugawa Motokichi, Japanese sumo wrestler (d. 1967)
  1900   – Gertrude Mary Cox, American mathematician (d. 1978)

1901–present
1901 – A. B. Guthrie, Jr., American novelist, screenwriter, historian (d. 1991)
  1901   – Mieczysław Żywczyński, Polish priest and historian (d. 1978)
1902 – Karl Menger, Austrian-American mathematician from the Vienna Circle (d. 1985)
1904 – Richard Addinsell, English composer (d. 1977)
  1904   – Nathan Milstein, Ukrainian-American violinist and composer (d. 1992)
  1904   – Dick Rowley, Irish footballer (d. 1984)
1905 – Kay Francis, American actress (d. 1968)
  1905   – Jack London, English sprinter and pianist (d. 1966)
1906 – Zhou Youguang, Chinese linguist, sinologist, and academic (d. 2017)
1909 – Helm Glöckler, German race car driver (d. 1993)
1910 – Yannis Tsarouchis, Greek painter and illustrator (d. 1989)
1911 – Joh Bjelke-Petersen, New Zealand-Australian farmer and politician, 31st Premier of Queensland (d. 2005)
1914 – Osa Massen, Danish-American actress (d. 2006) 
  1914   – Ted Willis, Baron Willis, English author, playwright, and screenwriter (d. 1992)
1919 – Robert Stack, American actor (d. 2003)
1921 – Necati Cumalı, Greek-Turkish author and poet (d. 2001)
  1921   – Dachine Rainer, American-English author and poet (d. 2000)
  1921   – Arthur Stevens, English footballer (d. 2007)
1922 – Albert Lamorisse, French director and producer (d. 1970)
1923 – Daniil Shafran, Russian cellist (d. 1997)
  1923   – Willem Slijkhuis, Dutch runner (d. 2003)
1924 – Paul Feyerabend, Austrian-Swiss philosopher and academic (d. 1994)
  1924   – Roland Petit, French dancer and choreographer (d. 2011)
1925 – Rosemary Murphy, American actress (d. 2014)
  1925   – Vanita Smythe, American singer and actress (d. 1994)
  1925   – Ron Tauranac, Australian engineer and businessman (d. 2020)
  1925   – Gwen Verdon, American actress and dancer (d. 2000)
1926 – Michael Bond, English author, created Paddington Bear (d. 2017)
  1926   – Carolyn Gold Heilbrun, American author and academic (d. 2003)
  1926   – Melba Liston, American trombonist and composer (d. 1999)
1927 – Brock Adams, American lawyer and politician, 5th United States Secretary of Transportation (d. 2004)
  1927   – Liz Anderson, American singer-songwriter (d. 2011)
  1927   – Sydney Brenner, South African biologist and academic, Nobel Prize laureate (d. 2019)
1929 – Joe Pass, American guitarist and composer (d. 1994)
1930 – Frances Sternhagen, American actress
1931 – Ian Hendry, English actor (d. 1984)
  1931   – Charles Nelson Reilly, American actor, comedian, director, game show panelist, and television personality (d. 2007)
  1931   – Rip Taylor, American actor and comedian (d. 2019)
1932 – Barry Bishop, American mountaineer, photographer, and scholar (d. 1994)
1933 – Tom Gola, American basketball player, coach, and politician (d. 2014) 
1936 – Renato Bruson, Italian opera singer
1937 – Guy Dodson, New Zealand-English biochemist and academic (d. 2012)
1938 – Cabu, French cartoonist (d. 2015)
  1938   – Daevid Allen, Australian singer-songwriter and guitarist (d. 2015)
  1938   – Richard Anthony, Egyptian-French singer-songwriter (d. 2015)
  1938   – Charlie Brill, American actor, voice artist, and comedian
  1938   – Dave Edwards, American captain and politician (d. 2013)
  1938   – Billy Gray, American actor, competitive motorcycle racer and inventor
  1938   – Tord Grip, Swedish footballer and manager
  1938   – Anna Home, English children's television executive and producer
1939 – Edgardo Cozarinsky, Argentinian author, screenwriter, and director
  1939   – Jacek Gmoch, Polish footballer and coach
  1939   – Cesare Maniago, Canadian ice hockey player
1940 – Edmund White, American novelist, memoirist, and essayist
1941 – Pasqual Maragall, Spanish academic and politician, 127th President of the Generalitat de Catalunya
  1941   – Meinhard Nehmer, German bobsledder
1943 – William Duckworth, American composer and author (d. 2012)
  1943   – Richard Moll, American actor
1945 – Gordon McVie, English oncologist and author (d. 2021)
  1945   – Peter Simpson, English footballer
1946 – Ordal Demokan, Turkish physicist and academic (d. 2004)
  1946   – Eero Koivistoinen, Finnish saxophonist, composer, and conductor
  1947   – Jacek Majchrowski, Polish historian, lawyer, and politician
  1947   – Carles Rexach, Spanish footballer and coach
1948 – Gaj Singh, Indian lawyer and politician
1949 – Rakesh Sharma, Indian commander, pilot, and cosmonaut
  1949   – Brandon Tartikoff, American screenwriter and producer (d. 1997)
1950 – Clive Betts, English economist and politician
  1950   – Bob Forsch, American baseball player (d. 2011)
  1950   – Gholam Hossein Mazloumi, Iranian footballer and manager (d. 2014)
1952 – Stephen Glover, English journalist, co-founded The Independent
1953 – Silvana Gallardo, American actress and producer (d. 2012)
1954 – Richard Blackford, English composer
  1954   – Trevor Rabin, South African-American singer-songwriter, guitarist, and producer
1955 – Paul Kelly, Australian singer-songwriter, guitarist, and producer 
  1955   – Jay McInerney, American novelist and critic
  1955   – Anne Pringle, English diplomat, British Ambassador to Russia
1957 – Claudia Emerson, American poet and academic (d. 2014)
  1957   – Mary Glindon, English lawyer and politician
  1957   – Mark O'Meara, American golfer
  1957   – Lorrie Moore, American short story writer
1958 – Francisco Buyo, Spanish footballer and manager
  1958   – Juan Pedro de Miguel, Spanish handball player (d. 2016)
1959 – Winnie Byanyima, Ugandan engineer, politician, and diplomat
1960 – Eric Betzig, American physicist and chemist, Nobel Prize laureate
  1960   – Matthew Bourne, English choreographer and director
1961 – Wayne Coyne, American singer-songwriter and musician
  1961   – Kelly Hrudey, Canadian ice hockey player and sportscaster
  1961   – Julia Louis-Dreyfus, American actress, comedian, and producer
1962 – Trace Adkins, American singer-songwriter and guitarist
  1962   – Paul Higgins, Canadian ice hockey player
1964 – Penelope Ann Miller, American actress
1965 – Bill Bailey, British musician and comedian
1966 – Patrick Dempsey, American actor and race car driver
  1966   – Leo Visser, Dutch speed skater and pilot
1968 – Mike Whitlow, English footballer and coach
1969 – Stefania Belmondo, Italian skier
  1969   – Stephen Hendry, Scottish snooker player and journalist
1970 – Frank Kooiman, Dutch footballer
  1970   – Marco Pantani, Italian cyclist (d. 2004)
  1970   – Shonda Rhimes, American actress, director, producer, and screenwriter
1972 – Mark Bosnich, Australian footballer and sportscaster
  1972   – Nicole Eggert, American actress
  1972   – Vitaly Scherbo, Belarusian gymnast
1973 – Nikolai Khabibulin, Russian ice hockey player
  1973   – Gigi Galli, Italian race driver
1974 – Sergei Brylin, Russian ice hockey player and coach
1975 – Rune Eriksen, Norwegian guitarist and composer 
  1975   – Mailis Reps, Estonian academic and politician, 31st Estonian Minister of Education and Research
  1975   – Andrew Yang, American entrepreneur, founder of Venture for America, and 2020 Democratic presidential candidate
1976 – Michael Peña, American actor
  1976   – Mario Yepes, Colombian footballer
1977 – Orlando Bloom, English actor
  1977   – Mi-Hyun Kim, South Korean golfer
  1977   – Elliot Mason, English trombonist and keyboard player
  1977   – James Posey, American basketball player and coach
1978 – Mohit Sharma, Indian Army Officer (d. 2009)
1978 – Nate Silver, American journalist and statistician, developed PECOTA
1979 – Katy Brand, English actress and screenwriter
1980 – Krzysztof Czerwiński, Polish organist and conductor
  1980   – Nils-Eric Johansson, Swedish footballer
  1980   – Akira Kaji, Japanese footballer
  1980   – Wolfgang Loitzl, Austrian ski jumper
  1980   – Mirko Soltau, German footballer
1981 – Reggie Brown, American football player
  1981   – Darrell Rasner, American baseball player
  1981   – Yujiro Takahashi, Japanese wrestler
1982 – Kamran Akmal, Pakistani cricketer
  1982   – Guillermo Coria, Argentinian tennis player
  1982   – Constantinos Makrides, Cypriot footballer
  1982   – Ruth Wilson, English actress
1983 – Ender Arslan, Turkish basketball player
  1983   – Sebastian Kneißl, German footballer
  1983   – Mauricio Martín Romero, Argentinian footballer
1984 – Matteo Cavagna, Italian footballer
  1984   – Kamghe Gaba, German sprinter
  1984   – Nick Mangold, American football player
1985 – Luke Robinson, American wrestler
1986 – Joannie Rochette, Canadian figure skater
1987 – Stefano Del Sante, Italian footballer
  1987   – Jack Johnson, American ice hockey player
  1987   – Florica Leonida, Romanian gymnast
  1987   – Steven Michaels, Australian rugby league player
  1987   – Daniel Oss, Italian cyclist
  1987   – Marc Staal, Canadian ice hockey player
1988 – Josh Freeman, American football player
1989 – Morgan Burnett, American football player
  1989   – Doug Martin, American football player
  1989   – Beau Mirchoff, Canadian-American actor
1990 – Vincenzo Fiorillo, Italian footballer
  1990   – Liam Hemsworth, Australian actor
1991 – Rob Kiernan, English-Irish footballer
1992 – Adam Matthews, Welsh footballer
  1992   – Dinah Pfizenmaier, German tennis player
1993 – Max Whitlock, English artistic gymnast
1995 – Natalia Dyer, American actress
1997 – Micah Hart, Canadian ice hockey player
  1997   – Connor McDavid, Canadian ice hockey player
  1997   – Ivan Provorov, Russian ice hockey player
  1997   – Egan Bernal, Colombian cyclist, winner of the 2019 Tour de France
  1997   – Luis Díaz, Colombian footballer
2003 – Oksana Selekhmeteva, Russian tennis player

Deaths

Pre-1600
86 BC – Gaius Marius, Roman general and politician (b. 157 BC)
 533 – Remigius, French bishop and saint (b. 437)
 614 – Mungo, English-Scottish bishop and saint
 703 – Jitō, Japanese empress (b. 645)
 858 – Æthelwulf, king of Wessex
888 – Charles the Fat, Frankish king and emperor (b. 839)
 927 – Berno of Cluny, Frankish monk and abbot
1001 – Fujiwara no Teishi, Japanese empress (b. 977)
1147 – Robert de Craon, Grand Master of the Knights Templar
1151 – Suger, French historian and politician (b. 1081)
1177 – Henry II, count palatine and duke of Austria (b. 1107)
1321 – Bonacossa Borri, Italian noblewoman (b. 1254)
1330 – Frederick I, duke and king of Germany
1363 – Meinhard III, German nobleman (b. 1344)
1400 – Thomas le Despenser, 1st Earl of Gloucester, English politician (b. 1373)
1599 – Edmund Spenser, English poet, Chief Secretary for Ireland (b. 1552)

1601–1900
1612 – Jane Dormer, English lady-in-waiting (b. 1538)
1625 – Jan Brueghel the Elder, Flemish painter (b. 1568)
1684 – Henry Howard, 6th Duke of Norfolk, English nobleman (b. 1628)
1691 – George Fox, English religious leader, founded the Religious Society of Friends (b. 1624)
1717 – Maria Sibylla Merian, German entomologist and illustrator (b. 1647)
1775 – Johann Georg Walch, German theologian and author (b. 1693)
1790 – Luc Urbain de Bouëxic, French admiral (b. 1712)
1796 – John Anderson, Scottish philosopher and educator (b. 1726)
1832 – Thomas Lord, English cricketer, founded Lord's Cricket Ground (b. 1755)
1838 – Ferdinand Ries, German pianist and composer (b. 1784)
1860 – William Mason, American surgeon and politician (b. 1786)
1864 – Stephen Foster, American composer and songwriter (b. 1826)
1872 – William Scamp, English architect and engineer (b. 1801)
1882 – Wilhelm Mauser, German engineer and businessman, co-founded the Mauser Company (b. 1834)
1885 – Schuyler Colfax, American journalist and politician, 17th Vice President of the United States (b. 1823)
1889 – Solomon Bundy, American lawyer and politician (b. 1823)

1901–present
1906 – Alexander Stepanovich Popov, Russian physicist and academic (b. 1859)
1907 – Jakob Hurt, Estonian theologist and linguist (b. 1839)
1915 – Mary Slessor, Scottish-Nigerian missionary (b. 1848)
1916 – Victoriano Huerta, Mexican military officer and president, 1913–1914 (b. 1850)
1923 – Alexandre Ribot, French academic and politician, Prime Minister of France (b. 1842)
1924 – Georg Hermann Quincke, German physicist and academic (b. 1834)
1929 – Wyatt Earp, American police officer (b. 1848)
  1929   – H. B. Higgins, Irish-Australian judge and politician, 3rd Attorney-General for Australia (b. 1851)
1934 – Paul Ulrich Villard, French physicist and chemist (b. 1860)
1941 – James Joyce, Irish novelist, short story writer, and poet (b. 1882)
1943 – Sophie Taeuber-Arp, Swiss painter and sculptor (b. 1889)
1949 – Aino Aalto, Finnish architect and designer (b. 1894)
1956 – Lyonel Feininger, German-American painter and illustrator (b. 1871)
1957 – A. E. Coppard English poet and short story writer (b. 1878)
1958 – Jesse L. Lasky, American film producer, co-founded Paramount Pictures (b. 1880) 
  1958   – Edna Purviance, American actress (b. 1895)
1962 – Ernie Kovacs, American actor and game show host (b. 1919)
1963 – Sylvanus Olympio, Togolese businessman and politician, President of Togo (b. 1902)
1967 – Anatole de Grunwald, Russian-English screenwriter and producer (b. 1910)
1971 – Robert Still, English composer and educator (b. 1910)
1973 – Sabahattin Eyüboğlu, Turkish screenwriter and producer (b. 1908)
1974 – Raoul Jobin, Canadian tenor and educator (b. 1906)
  1974   – Salvador Novo, Mexican playwright and poet (b. 1904)
1976 – Margaret Leighton, English actress (b. 1922)
1977 – Henri Langlois, Turkish-French historian, co-founded the Cinémathèque Française (b. 1914)
1978 – Hubert Humphrey, American pharmacist, academic, and politician, 38th Vice President of the United States (b. 1911)
  1978   – Joe McCarthy, American baseball player and manager (b. 1887)
1979 – Donny Hathaway, American singer-songwriter, pianist, and producer (b. 1945)
  1979   – Marjorie Lawrence, Australian-American soprano (b. 1907)
1980 – Andre Kostelanetz, Russian-American conductor (b. 1901)
1982 – Marcel Camus, French director and screenwriter (b. 1912)
1983 – René Bonnet, French race car driver and engineer (b. 1904)
1986 – Abdul Fattah Ismail, Yemeni educator and politician, 4th President of South Yemen (b. 1939)
  1986   – Kevin Longbottom, Australian rugby league player (b. 1940)
1988 – Chiang Ching-kuo, Chinese politician, President of the Republic of China (b. 1910)
1993 – Camargo Guarnieri, Brazilian composer and conductor (b. 1907)
1995 – Max Harris, Australian journalist, poet, and author (b. 1921)
2002 – Frank Shuster, Canadian actor, comedian, and screenwriter (b. 1916)
2003 – Norman Panama, American director and screenwriter (b. 1914)
2004 – Arne Næss, Jr., Norwegian businessman and mountaineer (b. 1937)
2005 – Earl Cameron, Canadian journalist (b. 1915)
  2005   – Nell Rankin, American soprano and actress (b. 1924)
2006 – Frank Fixaris, American journalist and sportscaster (b. 1934)
  2006   – Marc Potvin, Canadian-American ice hockey player and coach (b. 1967)
2007 – Michael Brecker, American saxophonist and composer (b. 1949)
  2007   – Danny Oakes, American race car driver (b. 1911)
2008 – Johnny Podres, American baseball player and coach (b. 1932)
2009 – Dai Llewellyn, Welsh socialite and politician (b. 1946)
  2009   – Patrick McGoohan, Irish-American actor, director, and producer (b. 1928)
  2009   – Mansour Rahbani, Lebanese poet, composer, and producer (b. 1925)
  2009   – W. D. Snodgrass, American poet (b. 1926)
  2009   – Nancy Bird Walton, Australian pilot (b. 1915)
2010 – Teddy Pendergrass, American singer-songwriter (b. 1950)
2011 – Albert Heijn, Dutch businessman (b. 1927)
2012 – Rauf Denktaş, Turkish-Cypriot lawyer and politician, 1st President of Northern Cyprus (b. 1924)
  2012   – Guido Dessauer, German physicist and engineer (b. 1915)
  2012   – Miljan Miljanić, Serbian footballer and manager (b. 1930)
2013 – Diogenes Allen, American philosopher and theologian (b. 1932)
  2013   – Rodney Mims Cook, Sr., American lieutenant and politician (b. 1924)
  2013   – Chia-Chiao Lin, Chinese-American mathematician and academic (b. 1916)
2014 – Bobby Collins, Scottish footballer and manager (b. 1931)
  2014   – Randal Tye Thomas, American journalist and politician (b. 1978)
  2014   – Waldemar von Gazen, German general and lawyer (b. 1917)
2015 – Mark Juddery, Australian journalist and author (b. 1971)
  2015   – Robert White, American diplomat, United States Ambassador to Paraguay (b. 1926)
2016 – Brian Bedford, English-American actor and director (b. 1935)
  2016   – Giorgio Gomelsky, Georgian-American director, producer, songwriter, and manager (b. 1934)
  2016   – Lawrence Phillips, American football player (b. 1975)
2017 – Antony Armstrong-Jones, 1st Earl of Snowdon, English photographer and a former member of the British royal family (b. 1930)
  2017   – Dick Gautier, American actor (b. 1931)
  2017   – Magic Alex, Greek electronics engineer (b. 1942)
2019 – Phil Masinga, South African footballer (b. 1969)
2020 – Bryan Monroe, American journalist and educator, (b. 1965)
  2020   – Philip Tartaglia, Scottish prelate, Catholic archbishop of Glasgow (b. 1951)

Holidays and observances
Christian feast day:
Blessed Veronica of Milan
Elian
Hilary of Poitiers
Mungo
St. Knut's Day or Tjugondag Knut, the last day of Christmas. (Sweden and Finland)
January 13 (Eastern Orthodox liturgics)
Constitution Day (Mongolia) 
Democracy Day (Cape Verde)
Liberation Day (Togo)
Old New Year's Eve (Russia, Belarus, Ukraine, Serbia, Montenegro, Republic of Srpska, North Macedonia), and its related observances:
Malanka (Ukraine, Russia, Belarus)
Sidereal winter solstice's eve celebrations in South and Southeast Asian cultures; the last day of the six-month Dakshinayana period (see January 14):
Bhogi (Andhra Pradesh, Tamil Nadu)
Lohri (Punjab, Haryana, Himachal Pradesh)
Uruka (Assam)
Stephen Foster Memorial Day (United States)
Yennayer (Berbers)

References

 - Total pages: 687
 - Total pages: 252

External links

 BBC: On This Day
 
 Historical Events on January 13

Days of the year
January